Notable people linked with Camberley, England include:

Simone Ashley, actress known for appearing in Bridgerton and Sex Education
5ive, boy band 1997-2001; were the subject of the television programme Neighbours From Hell whilst living in Camberley
Harold Balfour, 1st Baron Balfour of Inchrye airman and later politician; born in Camberley in 1897
Darren Barnard, former professional footballer currently playing for Camberley Town F.C.; has also played for Wales
Rufus Brevett, former professional footballer currently sporting director of Swindon Town; assistant coach of Camberley Town F.C. at the start of the 2007/08 season
Bros, late-1980s boy band, attended Collingwood school
Sam Brown, 1990s pop singer
Karina Bryant, British judoka 
Sharon Carr, Britain's youngest female murderer, killed a woman in Camberley in 1992 when aged 12
Paul Darke, academic, artist and disability rights activist
 Hugh Edwards, actor, played Piggy in the first film of William Golding's Lord of the Flies
Five Star, 1980s pop group, lived at Sunningdale 
Paul Gross, Canadian actor (Due South)
Holly Hull, singer, winner of the Disney Channel UK singing competition My Camp Rock
Hundred Reasons, alt rock band
George Edward Lodge
Helen Macdonald (born 1970), English writer and naturalist, best known as the author of H is for Hawk
Brian McBride, President of the CBI
The Members, punk rock band famous for the hit "Sound Of The Suburbs"
Graham Parker, pop singer
Olly Pearson, lead vocalist with doom metal band Moss
John Pennycuick, engineer who built Mullai Periyar Dam widely admired in Tamil Nadu
Adam Powell, co-founder of Neopets
Mitchell Crossland-Scott, International American Football Player for New Zealand
Andy Quin, composer and pianist
Reuben, rock/metal band
Tim Sills, professional footballer; started his career at Camberley Town FC, playing for various clubs including two spells at Aldershot Town; as of 2014 was still making his way around the lower leagues of English football
Paul Sloane, author and speaker on lateral thinking and innovation
Dame Ethel Smyth, lived as a child at Frimhurst, Frimley Green, and as an adult for some time on the Portsmouth Road, Camberley at the house that is now The One Oak Pub
David Speedie, played for Chelsea; lived in Camberley; was a member of Camberley working men's club
Chris Stainton, session musician and member of the Eric Clapton touring band.
Richard Stilgoe, lyricist and musician
Arthur Sullivan, of Gilbert and Sullivan fame, started writing The Golden Legend whilst living in Camberley; the site of his house is now occupied by a McDonald's restaurant
Benjamin Symons, guitarist in UK metal band Malefice
Frederick Twort, English bacteriologist who undertook some of the earliest research on bacteriophage. Born in Camberley in 1877.
Rick Wakeman, solo artist and ex-keyboard player with progressive rock band Yes
Anthony Wall
Donna Williams, co-founder of Neopets
Bruce Woolley, writer of "Video Killed the Radio Star"
Dora Amy Elles, writer of novels under the pseudonym Patricia Wentworth
Revolvo, electronica band (1994-2005)
Darren Turner, professional racing driver

References

 
Camberley